The Guanyin Bridge is a historic stone arch bridge in Nanxun, Huzhou, Zhejiang, China. It is the largest bridge in the town of Nanxun.

History
The original bridge dates back to the Song dynasty (960–1279). The current bridge was reconstructed in 1798, during the reign of Jiaqing Emperor of the Qing dynasty (1644–1911). It underwent three renovations, respectively in the 5th year of Xianfeng period (1855) and in the 7th year of Xianfeng period (1857) and in the ruling of Tongzhi Emperor (1866). In the Ming (1368–1644) and Qing dynasties, a bustling silk fair was held near the bridge. In March 1989, it was designated as municipal level cultural heritage by the Huzhou Municipal Government.

Architecture

References

Bibliography
 

Bridges in Zhejiang
Arch bridges in China
Bridges completed in 1798
Qing dynasty architecture
1798 establishments in China